is a 2020 Japanese anime adventure film produced by Toei Animation and animated by Yumeta Company. The film was released in Japanese theaters on February 21, 2020. Set in the same continuity of the first two Digimon television anime series, the film serves as the series finale of the original Digimon Adventure story.

The feature film is a commercial success, grossing more than 24 million dollars worldwide. Due to its exploitation in limited releases in most countries of the world, and the total absence of theatrical release in the United States, the vast majority of these revenue respectively comes from China (more than 19 million US$), Japan and Hong Kong. A solid business amid the COVID-19 pandemic-related reopening process in various parts of Asia. Originally scheduled to have a limited release in the U.S. by Fathom Events, the event was cancelled due to the pandemic and its impact on cinemas ; the film was released in the U.S. on home media formats on October 6, 2020.

Last Evolution Kizuna received little attention from film critics, it drew extremely positive reviews from the pop culture and anime media in North America, which viewed the film as a satisfactory conclusion to the Adventure arc and praised the story, the animation, the English vocal and the bittersweet execution of the film's themes. In Europe, experts were more severe, especially with regard to its loaded dialogues and a particular stylistic approach, susceptible to lose a large audience.

A sequel titled Digimon Adventure 02: The Beginning, which will serve as the series finale of the Digimon Adventure 02 story, is under development.

Plot 
Five years after the events of Digimon Adventure tri., Tai and the other DigiDestined are approaching adulthood; however, Tai and Matt still remain undecided about their future goals. The DigiDestined later meet Menoa Bellucci, a professor at Columbia University in New York City, and Kyotaro Imura, her bodyguard. Menoa claims that Eosmon is targeting DigiDestined around the world by robbing both them and their Digimon partners of their consciousness. With Menoa's help, Tai, Matt, Izzy, T.K., and their Digimon fight Eosmon on the Internet.

When Tai and Matt fuse their Digimon into Omnimon, their form falls apart, allowing Eosmon to escape. In the real world, Tai and Matt find countdown rings on their Digivices. Menoa explains the Digivices are powered by the infinite potential of children, and because Tai and Matt are growing up with their potential fulfilled, they have a time limit before they are separated from their Digimon forever. She also warns them that Digivolving will accelerate the countdown. While Izzy examines Eosmon's gems, Matt suspects Imura is involved with Eosmon, and asks Davis, Yolei, Cody and Ken to investigate Menoa's job in New York. Meanwhile, Gennai visits Tai and Agumon, corroborating Menoa's statement.

After Eosmon leaves Mimi unconscious, Matt gives Tai and Izzy prepaid mobile phones out of suspicion they are being tracked and also shows them a news article revealing that Menoa used to have a Digimon partner. As Matt continues to investigate Imura, he learns from Davis' group that Imura's identity is fake and Eosmon's data was found on his hard drive, deducing that he is the culprit. Izzy is sent a link to a live stream video of T.K. and Kari held hostage, prompting Tai and Matt to rescue them, while Joe goes missing. By the time they arrive, T.K. and Kari are already unconscious from Eosmon. On the way, Matt confronts Imura, who reveals he is an FBI agent investigating Menoa, and he realizes that Menoa orchestrated the kidnappings and Eosmon as a distraction to target Izzy for the list of DigiDestined. Realizing this as well, Izzy texts Tai with the coordinates to Menoa's location in the Digital World, before she renders him unconscious.

In the Digital World, Menoa confirms that she lost her Digimon partner, Morphomon, prematurely from growing up, and discovered Eosmon's digi-egg during the recent aurora. To prevent the other DigiDestined from experiencing loss, she has captured their consciousness to allow them to be with their Digimon partners as children forever. Menoa sends a swarm of Eosmon clones to the real world to kidnap more DigiDestined, sparking battles worldwide. Tai, Matt, and their Digimon resolve to stop Menoa even if it quickens their separation, and Agumon and Gabumon fuse into Omnimon to fight her and the Eosmon clones. After Menoa biomerges with Eosmon, Eosmon cuts Omnimon into pieces, causing it to split again. Tai and Matt are assaulted by the DigiDestined and their Digimon partners, but Tai awakens and turns them back to normal with Kari's whistle. While the DigiDestined and their Digimon partners join the battle, Tai, Matt, and their Digimon make one final Digivolution, forming Agumon (Bond of Courage) and Gabumon (Bond of Friendship). The two Digimon defeat Eosmon, with Menoa finding closure with Morphomon.

After the battle, Imura arrests Menoa. Tai and Matt spend their remaining time with Agumon and Gabumon respectively, until they vanish and their Digivices turn into stone. The next spring, Tai and Matt move on with their lives and pursue their dream careers, under the belief that they may see their Digimon partners again in the future.

Voice cast 

The Japanese cast of Digimon Adventure tri. returned to reprise their roles. As was the case with that series of films, the DigiDestined characters from Digimon Adventure 02 were recast with new actors while their Digimon retained their original actors. The English cast from Digimon Adventure tri. reprised their roles with two recast roles. As for the Digidestined and their Digimon from Digimon Adventure 02, all characters were recast to new actors, except Ken, Veemon and Wormmon who retained their original actors.

Development

A new film project was announced on July 29, 2018 as part of the series' 20th anniversary. The film, titled Digimon Adventure: Last Evolution Kizuna, is directed by Tomohisa Taguchi and written by Akatsuki Yamatoya, featuring animation by Yumeta Company. It was then teased on Toei's YouTube film account that Toei Animation is producing the film, and the rest of the staff and cast are returning to reprise their roles. It premiered on February 21, 2020.

Development for Last Evolution Kizuna started in 2017, whilst Digimon Adventure tri. was in the middle of airing. It was made as the staff realized the Digimon Adventure series was the most popular part of the Digimon franchise as a whole after the positive reception to Adventure tri., so they decided to make another Adventure movie for its 20th anniversary. Toei aimed the main cast to become far more likable as characters. While the teenagers were known as heroes in television series, they had yet to mature in the narrative to be appeal more to the audience.

On May 28, 2018, original Director of Digimon Adventure and Digimon Adventure 02, Hiroyuki Kakudo revealed he had quit the staff of Digimon Adventure: Last Evolution Kizuna after something was approved that he claimed was incompatible with what the previous series had established. On September 20, 2020, Producer Yosuke Kinoshita stated that Digimon Adventure: Last Evolution Kizuna is in continuity with Digimon Adventure, Digimon Adventure 02, Digimon Adventure 02: Digimon Hurricane Landing!!/Transcendent Evolution!! The Golden Digimentals, and Digimon Adventure tri.. This included the end of the final episode of 02, set in 2028, where the DigiDestined are adults.

Before the film's release in the U.S., Comic Book Resources held an interview with Executive Producer Yosuke Kinoshita regarding the franchise itself and what he wanted the fans to take away from the film. During the interview, Yosuke stated, "As we go through life, I believe that it is not only success and joy that makes you grow as a person but also overcoming failure. Hard and sad realities are what keeps us alive. I'm sure there will be a lot of obstacles in the future, but let's go live our lives forward strongly! This is the message that we are trying to convey."

During the production of the English dub, Brian Donovan was supposed to reprise Davis Motomiya. Unfortunately, he was unable to because of a fault in his home studio and the role was recast to Griffin Burns. Additionally, the rest of the English Dub production began around February 2020 and finished up at the end of spring. Majority of the cast recorded their sessions from their Home studio due to the ongoing pandemic.

Release 
The film was released in Japanese theaters on February 21, 2020. Set in the same continuity of the first two Digimon television anime series, the film serves as the finale to the original Digimon Adventure story.

The film was also scheduled to be released in its original Japanese format with English subtitles through Fathom Events in the United States on March 25, 2020, but was cancelled because of movie theater closures due to the COVID-19 pandemic. The film was set to be released direct-to-video in the United States on July 7, 2020 but production was delayed indefinitely on May 9, 2020. On July 20, 2020, it was announced it will be released digitally on September 29, 2020, and on DVD/Blu-ray on October 6, 2020.

The Japanese release of the DVD and Blu-ray was released on September 2, 2020 along with an audio drama to come with it on CD.

Reception 
Last Evolution Kizuna, while unnoticed by cinema reviewers, received very positive reviews from pop culture and anime media when it was released in the US. European film critics, though, were more severe.

Kambole Cambell from IGN gave the film a 9/10, stating, "An impressively bold and mature final installment, Digimon Adventure: Last Evolution Kizuna realizes the full potential of its cast and the power of a definitive ending, driven by an inventive visual sensibility, exciting set-pieces, and heart-wrenching emotional stakes." Common Sense Media gave the film a 4/5, stating, "This is a bittersweet coming-of-age story that manages to transcend the expected anime battles and action. For those coming into the movie without knowing all of the ins and outs of this particular anime universe, the movie's heady themes of life and death, growing up and moving on, and making your own way in the world are poignant, universal, and relatable."

Polygon gave the film a positive review, stating, "It's a love letter not only to the entire franchise, but to those who have grown up watching these characters throughout the years. This is the conclusion fans have been waiting for." Comic Book Resources also gave the film a positive review, stating, "Last Evolution isn't a cinematic masterpiece (no surprise there) but what it is a masterclass on how to age a long-running, commercial property with grace and bring it to a conclusion with dignity. The original DigiDestined's journey, as we once knew it, is over, but this isn't a story about putting away childish things."

Critics praised the film for its themes of adulthood and, "letting things go." Daryl Harding of Crunchyroll states that, "it is about growing up and letting go. For the characters, it's hard to be a DigiDestined and still have a job – apparently saving the world doesn't pay well. It's not about them choosing what to focus on, it's about them learning how to juggle both responsibilities without cracking." Regarding the themes, IGN also felt that the film handled them very well, "It's ultimately bittersweet, but the film's embrace of change is tackled with inspiring optimism, positing that moving forward shouldn't be treated as a loss, but as a new direction, definitively closing this chapter of Digimon Adventure while looking forward to what new things might spring from it." Regarding the themes, Polygon also stated "for those who are on board with the way the film handles the transition out of childhood, Last Evolution will be like saying goodbye to a childhood friend you don't often speak to, but still hold close to your heart."

The film drew comparisons to Mamoru Hosoda's previous works on Digimon, as well as drawing comparisons to Toy Story 3. Polygon stated, "Like Toy Story 3, Kizuna goes for a bittersweet conclusion that waves goodbye to childhood while suggesting that eventually, we all learn to find a balance between our responsibilities and our desires...Digimon Adventure: Last Evolution Kizuna manages to be the best addition to the Digimon franchise since Mamoru Hosoda was at the helm. Its references to previous franchise installments, its surprising cameos, and its emotional story all help put a bow on 20 years of adventures, while providing a nice returning point for fans who may have skipped the underwhelming Tri series of films." IGN stated, "The hallmarks of Mamoru Hosoda (who directed the first Digimon movie along with a number of short films) are still in play, with simple yet creative visual distinctions between the digital world and in the real world, clean red lines used to draw characters while moving about the former, sometimes flattening their coloring as the space around them changes. The conclusion recalls the likes of Toy Story 3 and How to Train Your Dragon: The Hidden World, as a film that trusts its audience to be able to let go, though here with a more definitive and perhaps even more heart-wrenching finality."

In his review of the film, Christopher Farris of Anime News Network recognizes the appeal of the visual and animation, the interesting concepts for the franchise and the effectively nostalgic English dubbing, but judges that the film is fundamentally at odds with itself and its own nostalgia, and that the focus on the characters is frustrating and uneven, and gave the film a C-.

In stark contrast, however, European reviewers were more critical of the film.  For the European daily El Correo, it is an opus "that does not dare to describe with the necessary thoroughness the theme it tries to develop", and deplores the lack of risk-taking in its direction and codes, "Last Evolution Kizuna replays a tape already played" and gave the film a 1/3. For Deciné21, it is a film that falls into the pitfalls of Japanese anime films "with repetitive passages and endless dialogue. Above all, it is aimed at fans, so newcomers will find it difficult to assimilate all the concepts of the series too quickly", while nevertheless praising "certain passages that are quite moving. In addition, the animation is of a high enough quality to be a surprise" and gave the film a 5/10. For MyMovies.it, "we are dealing with a standard current animated film, aimed at an ultra-specific audience that will know everything about the situation and will ideally grasp every detour and self-reference of the franchise", but praises the "more melancholic atmosphere than usual and a more mature awareness of the transience of things" and gave the film a 2.5/5. The daily El Punt gave 2/5 to the film.

Digimon Adventure 20th Memorial Story 
 is a series of Japanese anime shorts related to Digimon Adventure: Last Evolution Kizuna, the first of which, To Sora, being a prequel set a day before the film. The rest feature side stories about the DigiDestined and their Partner Digimon going about their every day lives that were unable to make it into the film itself.

Episodes

Sequel 
Between August 2021 and July 2022, a sequel titled Digimon Adventure 02: The Beginning was announced. The film will serve as the series finale of the Digimon Adventure 02 story.

Notes

References

External links 
  
 
 

2020 films
2020 anime films
Adventure anime and manga
Animated adventure films
Anime and manga about parallel universes
Digimon films
Fantasy anime and manga
Films set in 2010
Japanese fantasy adventure films
Japanese sequel films
Films about parallel universes
Science fiction anime and manga
Toei Animation films
Yumeta Company
Anime postponed due to the COVID-19 pandemic
Films not released in theaters due to the COVID-19 pandemic